This is a list of the 216 accepted species in the genus Cuscuta:

Cuscuta species 

Cuscuta abyssinica A.Rich.
Cuscuta acuta Engelm.
Cuscuta acutiloba Engelm.
Cuscuta africana Willd.
Cuscuta alata Brandegee
Cuscuta alatiloba Yunck.
Cuscuta americana L.
Cuscuta andina Phil.
Cuscuta angulata Engelm.
Cuscuta appendiculata Engelm.
Cuscuta approximata Bab. - alfalfa dodder (Eurasia, Africa)
Cuscuta argentinana Yunck.
Cuscuta atrans Feinbrun
Cuscuta australis R.Br.
Cuscuta azteca Costea & M.A.R.Wright
Cuscuta babylonica Aucher ex Choisy
Cuscuta balansae Boiss. & Reut. ex Yunck.
Cuscuta basarabica Buia
Cuscuta bella Yunck.
Cuscuta bifurcataYunck.
Cuscuta blepharolepis Welw. ex Hiern
Cuscuta boldinghii  Urb.
Cuscuta boliviana Yunck.
Cuscuta bonafortunae Costea & I.García
Cuscuta brachycalyx (Yunck.) Yunck.
Cuscuta bracteataEngelm.
Cuscuta brevistyla A.Braun ex A.Rich.
Cuscuta bucharica Palib.
Cuscuta burrellii Yunck.
Cuscuta californica Hook. & Arn. - California dodder (western North America)
Cuscuta callinema Butkov
Cuscuta camelorum Pavlov
Cuscuta campestris Yunck.
Cuscuta capitata Roxb.
Cuscuta carnosa Costea & I.García
Cuscuta cassytoides Nees ex Engelm.
Cuscuta castroviejoi M.A.García
Cuscuta ceanothi Behr
Cuscuta cephalanthi Engelm.
Cuscuta chapalana Yunck.
Cuscuta chilensis  Ker Gawl.
Cuscuta chinensis Lam.
Cuscuta chittagongensis Sengupta, M.S.Khan & Huq
Cuscuta choisiana Yunck.
Cuscuta cockerellii Yunck.
Cuscuta colombiana Yunck.
Cuscuta compacta Juss. ex Choisy
Cuscuta convallariiflora Pavlov
Cuscuta corniculata Engelm.
Cuscuta coryli Engelm.
Cuscuta corymbosa Ruiz & Pav.
Cuscuta costaricensis Yunck.
Cuscuta cotijana Costea & I.García
Cuscuta cozumeliensis Yunck.
Cuscuta cristata Engelm.
Cuscuta cuspidata Engelm. & A.Gray
Cuscuta decipiens Yunck.
Cuscuta deltoidea Yunck.
Cuscuta dentatasquamata Yunck.
Cuscuta denticulata Engelm.
Cuscuta desmouliniana Palib.
Cuscuta draconella Costea & M.A.R.Wright
Cuscuta durangana  Yunck.
Cuscuta elpassiana Pavlov
Cuscuta epilinum Weihe
Cuscuta epithymum (L.) L. – clover dodder (Eurasia, Africa)
Cuscuta erosa Yunck.
Cuscuta europaea L. – greater dodder (Europe)
Cuscuta exaltata Engelm.
Cuscuta ferganensis Butkov
Cuscuta flossdorfii Hicken
Cuscuta foetida Kunth
Cuscuta friesii Yunck.
Cuscuta gennesaretana Sroëlov ex Feinbr. & S.Taub
Cuscuta gerrardii Baker
Cuscuta gigantea  Griff.
Cuscuta glabrior (Engelm.) Yunck.
Cuscuta globiflora Engelm.
Cuscuta globosa Ridl.
Cuscuta globulosa Benth.
Cuscuta glomerata Choisy
Cuscuta goyaziana Yunck.
Cuscuta gracillima Engelm.
Cuscuta grandiflora Kunth
Cuscuta gronovii Willd. ex Schult.
Cuscuta gymnocarpa  Engelm.
Cuscuta harperi Small
Cuscuta haughtii Yunck.
Cuscuta haussknechtii Yunck.
Cuscuta hitchcockii Yunck.
Cuscuta howelliana P.Rubtzov
Cuscuta hyalina Roth ex Schult.
Cuscuta iguanella Costea & I.García
Cuscuta incurvata  Progel
Cuscuta indecora  Choisy
Cuscuta insolita Costea & I.García
Cuscuta insquamata Yunck.
Cuscuta jalapensis Schltdl.
Cuscuta japonica Choisy
Cuscuta jepsonii Yunck.
Cuscuta karatavica Pavlov
Cuscuta kilimanjari Oliv.
Cuscuta kotschyana Boiss.
Cuscuta krishnae Udayan & Robi
Cuscuta kurdica Engelm.
Cuscuta lacerata Yunck.
Cuscuta legitima Costea & M.A.R.Wright
Cuscuta lehmanniana Bunge
Cuscuta leptantha Engelm.
Cuscuta letourneuxii Trab.
Cuscuta liliputana Costea & M.A.R.Wright
Cuscuta lindsayi Wiggins
Cuscuta longiloba Yunck
Cuscuta lophosepala Butkov
Cuscuta lucidicarpa Yunck
Cuscuta lupuliformis Krock.
Cuscuta macrocephala  Schaffner ex Yuncker
Cuscuta macrolepis R.C.Fang & S.H.Huang
Cuscuta macvaughii Yunck.
Cuscuta maroccana Trab.
Cuscuta membranacea Yunck.
Cuscuta mesatlantica Dobignard
Cuscuta mexicana Yunck.
Cuscuta micrantha Choisy
Cuscuta microstyla Engelm.
Cuscuta mitriformis Engelm. ex Hemsl.
Cuscuta modesta Costea & M.A.R.Wright
Cuscuta monogyna Vahl
Cuscuta montana Costea & M.A.R.Wright
Cuscuta natalensis Baker
Cuscuta nevadensis I.M.Johnst.
Cuscuta nitida E.Mey. ex Choisy
Cuscuta nivea M.A.García
Cuscuta obtusata (Engelm.) Trab.
Cuscuta obtusiflora Kunth
Cuscuta occidentalis Millsp.
Cuscuta odontolepis Engelm.
Cuscuta odorata Ruiz & Pav.
Cuscuta orbiculata Yunck.
Cuscuta ortegana Yunck.
Cuscuta pacifica Costea & M.A.R.Wright – salt marsh dodder 
Cuscuta paitana Yunck.
Cuscuta palaestina Boiss.
Cuscuta palustris Yunck.
Cuscuta pamirica Butkov
Cuscuta parodiana Yunck.
Cuscuta partita Choisy
Cuscuta parviflora Engelm.
Cuscuta pauciflora Phil.
Cuscuta pedicellata Ledeb.
Cuscuta pellucida Butkov
Cuscuta pentagona Engelm. – golden dodder (United States)
Cuscuta peruviana Yunck.
Cuscuta planiflora Ten.
Cuscuta plattensis A.Nelson
Cuscuta platyloba Progel
Cuscuta polyanthemos Schaffner ex Yuncker
Cuscuta polygonorum Engelm.
Cuscuta potosina Schaffner ex S.Watson
Cuscuta prismatica Pav. ex Choisy
Cuscuta pulchella Engelm.
Cuscuta punana Costea & M.A.R.Wright
Cuscuta purpurata Phil.
Cuscuta purpusii Yunck.
Cuscuta pusilla Phil. ex Yunck.
Cuscuta racemosa Mart.
Cuscuta rausii M.A.García
Cuscuta reflexa Roxb.
Cuscuta rojasii Hunz.
Cuscuta rostrata Shuttlew. ex Engelm. & A.Gray
Cuscuta rostricarpa Yunck.
Cuscuta rotundiflora Hunz.
Cuscuta rubella Yunck.
Cuscuta rugosiceps Yunck.
Cuscuta runyonii Yunck.
Cuscuta ruschanica Yunusov
Cuscuta rustica Hunz.
Cuscuta salina Engelm. – salt marsh dodder (western United States)
Cuscuta sandwichiana Choisy – Kaunaoa (Hawaii)
Cuscuta santapaui Banerji & S.Das
Cuscuta scandens Yunck.
Cuscuta schlechteri Yunck.
Cuscuta serrata Yunck.
Cuscuta sharmanum Mukerjee & P.K.Bhattach.
Cuscuta sidarum Liebm.
Cuscuta somaliensis Yunck.
Cuscuta squamata Engelm.
Cuscuta stenocalycina Palib.
Cuscuta stenolepis Engelm.
Cuscuta strobilacea Liebm.
Cuscuta suaveolens Ser.
Cuscuta suksdorfii Yunck.
Cuscuta syrtorum Arbajeva
Cuscuta taimensis  P.P.A.Ferreira & Dettke
Cuscuta tasmanica Engelm.
Cuscuta tatei Yunck
Cuscuta timida Costea & M.A.R.Wright
Cuscuta timorensis Decne. ex Engelm.
Cuscuta tinctoria Mart. ex Engelm.
Cuscuta tolteca Costea & M.A.R.Wright
Cuscuta trichostyla Engelm.
Cuscuta triumvirati Lange
Cuscuta tuberculata Brandegee
Cuscuta umbellata Kunth
Cuscuta umbrosa Beyr. ex Hook.
Cuscuta vandevenderi Costea & M.A.R.Wright.
Cuscuta veatchii Brandegee
Cuscuta victoriana Yunck.
Cuscuta violacea Rajput & Syeda
Cuscuta volcanica Costea & I.García
Cuscuta warneri Yunck.
Cuscuta werdermannii Hunz.
Cuscuta woodsonii Yunck.
Cuscuta xanthochortos Mart. ex Engelm.
Cuscuta yucatana Yunck.
Cuscuta yunckeriana Hunz.

References 

Cuscuta
Cuscuta